Zachrisson is a surname. Notable people with the surname include:

Inger Zachrisson (born 1936), Swedish archaeologist
Li Zachrisson (born 1986), Swedish singer known professionally as Lykke Li
Mattias Zachrisson (born 1990), Swedish handball player
Vendela Zachrisson (born 1978), Swedish sailor

Swedish-language surnames